"Hayya Hayya (Better Together)" is a song by American singer Trinidad Cardona, Nigerian singer Davido and Qatari singer AISHA. It is the first single of the multi-song 2022 FIFA World Cup official soundtrack. The track was produced by RedOne and was released on April 1, 2022. The title contains the Arabic word hayyā (هيا), an interjection meaning "let's go!"

Music video
The music video for the song was released on April 1, 2022. It features Trinidad Cardona, Davido, AISHA and RedOne.

Click here to see the FIFA official music video.

Credits and personnel
 Trinidad Cardona – lyrics, composition, vocals
 Davido – composition, vocals
 AISHA (Aisha Aziani) – vocals
 RedOne – lyrics, composition, production, arrangement, background vocals

Charts

Release history

See also
 List of FIFA World Cup songs and anthems

References

2022 singles
2022 songs
FIFA World Cup official songs and anthems
Song recordings produced by RedOne
Songs written by RedOne
Universal Music Group singles
Songs written by Davido
Macaronic songs